Hamro Team is a Nepalese television soap opera, telecasted in the Nepal on Kantipur Television. Hamro Team story  is of the Nepali version of The Team – Hamro Team, has been written by a group of Nepali writers working closely with Search for Common Ground Nepal and is being produced locally with AB Pictures Pvt. Ltd. Hamro Team, 13 episodes, is directed by Bhusan Dahal. It premiered on 9 June 2011 and concluded on 1 September 2011.

The series was originally screened as a half-hour episode on Thursday, 9 pm every week.

Plot
The story of Hamro Team is about people from different lifestyles coming together to achieve a common goal. It is about daring to dream, and to fight all odds to pursue it. Hamro Team is about knowing what you are as an individual, and what you can be as a team. Along the way of their progress to unite as a group they face a lot of difficulties but in the end when they worked like a team they won the championships of the national levels.

Seema
Seema is a star player in a girl's national football team. She also coaches students in a local high school. She is an excellent striker, an effective captain and a potential leader. Her father (also her coach in the girls’ football team) and mother are happy that Seema has won a DV Lottery Visa to US and that she will be leaving football (”Girls have no future in sports in Nepal.”) to pursue a more prosperous and safer future. But Seema has a different dream. Sanket, a businessman takes over a project in which he wants to produce a national football team with players from around the country and he persuades Seema to be the team coach for the all men football team.

Sanket
Sanket, from a well-off Kathmandu family, has just returned after his studies in the US. He believes he can do something worthwhile in Nepal. Son of a bank manager, he has started working in the bank. He now wants to form a football team for the promotion of the bank. His dream is to form a unique Nepali team which can accommodate talented Nepali young players from all over the country irrespective of their castes, groups or backgrounds

Resham
In the search of the players, they find interesting people along the way. Resham, a young man of Tharu community from Dang district, is involved with an armed group. The gang loot and rob, and Resham has been forcefully dragged into the activities of the gang. Resham wants to free himself out of the gang, and wants to pursue his passion in football. His dream is to be a good football player.

Chandrakanta
Chandrakanta is from a Madhesi dalit family. His father runs the business of a wedding band. Ghanashyam does not have a year for music and plays poorly. Despite that, he has been forced to play in his father's band. His dream, however, is to be a professional footballer. He decides to quit his father's band to play football.

Safiq
Safiq belongs to a Muslim family in Pokhara. He fell in love with a Hindu girl, married her against the will of families and society and ran away to Birgunj. Even though a good football player in Pokhara, he has not been able to establish his identity as a footballer in Birgunj, where he pulls a rickshaw to make ends meet. His ideal player is Cristiano Ronaldo.

Ricky
Ricky, Sanket's cousin brother, is a good football player from a club in Kathmandu. However, he is not satisfied with playing in the club. He wants to do something new and big in football. He belongs to a well-to-do Kathmandu elite class, and is a snob.

Toran
Toran was in Maoist army. After being listed as 'disqualified' by UNMIN (United Nations Mission in Nepal), he was discharged from one of the cantonments established after the Comprehensive Peace Accord between the ruling parties and the Maoists. He still has faith in the progressive approach and political line of thinking of his party for social change and nation's development. And, he has passion in football. Now his aim in life is to be a good football player.

Episodes

Production
Hamro Team is a part of a multi-country television episodic drama being... produced by Search for Common Ground and Common Ground Productions with local partners in each of these countries. International project, The Team, is being implemented in Kenya, Ivory Coast, Morocco, Ethiopia, Democratic Republic of Congo, Liberia, Nepal, Palestine, Sierra Leone, Angola, Burundi, Guinea, Indonesia, Pakistan and Zimbabwe. The Team in Ethiopia, Burundi and Guinea are radio programs whereas rest of the countries produce it as television series.

The Team in all these countries has common themes of good governance, teamwork, leadership and cooperation across dividing lines. The story is built on the backdrop of football (with exception of Pakistan, where it is cricket) because of the universal appeal of the game, but is written by local writers and is different from country to country.

The story of the Nepali version of The Team – Hamro Team, has been written by a group of Nepali writers working closely with Search for Common Ground Nepal and is being produced locally with AB Pictures Pvt. Ltd. Hamro Team, 13 episodes, is directed by Bhusan Dahal.

Cast
 Reecha Sharma as Seema
 Eelum as Sanket
 Niraj Kumar Chaudhary as Resham
 Ghanashyam Kumar Mishra as Chandrakanta
 Mohammed Abdul Khan as Safiq
 Sauram Raj Tuladhar as Ricky
 Daya Hang Rai as Toran

References

External links 
 Hamro Team official site

Kantipur Television series
2011 Nepalese television series debuts
Television shows set in Nepal
Sports television series
2010s Nepalese television series
2011 Nepalese television series endings